Mäetaguse may refer to several places in Estonia:

Mäetaguse Parish, municipality in Ida-Viru County
Mäetaguse, small borough in Mäetaguse Parish, Ida-Viru County
Mäetaguse village, Ida-Viru County, village in Mäetaguse Parish, Ida-Viru County
Mäetaguse, Lääne-Viru County, village in Vinni Parish, Lääne-Viru County

vo:Mäetaguse